Julie Rotblatt-Amrany (born July 23, 1958) is an American sculptor and painter whose work explores the resurgence of the figure in modern art.

Works 
 The Spirit: Michael Jordan, heroic sculpture
 Healing Energy (painting)
 Petroushka I and II, sculpture
 Quest for Exploration: James A. Lovell, installation
 Veterans Memorial Park in Munster, Indiana
 George Halas Memorial, epic bas-relief
 Chicago White Sox 2005 World Champions, epic bas-relief
 Preservation of the Union, epic bas-relief

Early life and training 
Born in Chicago, Illinois, Rotblatt-Amrany grew up in Highland Park, Illinois. She completed a B.A. in art at the University of Colorado, Boulder, spending her junior year abroad at the University of Bordeaux in France. Influenced by the works of Michelangelo, Rotblatt-Amrany developed an artistic interest in the human figure at a time in which that study was not favored in academia.

After college, Rotblatt-Amrany trained at the Art Institute of Chicago in the figure drawing, painting, and sculpting from life. After moving to the San Francisco Bay Area in 1982, she focused on figurative studies at the College of Marin.  As part of her studies, Rotblatt-Amrany dissected cadavers at the Indian Valley campus in a program intended for medical students. She also studied from the model under sculptor Manuel Neri at the University of California, Davis.

Rotblatt-Amrany participated in several art projects in the Bay area, including assisting on a mural for the Oakland Art Museum.

Italy 
Under Neri, Rotblatt-Amrany developed an interest in carving marble.  In 1985, she traveled to Perugia in Italy as part of a program offered by Boston University, drawing from life and experimenting with stone.

Rotblatt-Amrany moved to Pietrasanta, the site of marble quarries that Michelangelo used for many of his sculptures. She began work at Studio Sem, which executed commissions for major sculptors such as Henry Moore. There she created Transference in Time, which reflected her growing fascination and exploration of space and time and the eternal nature of consciousness. Switching to Santoli's Studio, she devoted several months to the creation of a large bas-relief on a one-ton block of rose-colored slate from Assisi. Titled "Holding the Source," the work was shipped to Northern California, where it was later destroyed in an earthquake.

While in Pietrasanta, Rotblatt-Amrany met her future husband, Israeli artist Omri Amrany. The couple married in 1987 and lived for two years at the Kibbutz Ashdot Ya'akov Meuhadin in Northern Israel.  Their son Itamar was born in Israel in 1989. That same year, the couple moved to Chicago.

Fine Art Studio of Rotblatt-Amrany 
Back in the United States, Rotblatt-Amrany undertook various teaching jobs and other positions.

In 1992 Rotblatt-Amrany and Amrany founded the Fine Art Studio of Rotblatt-Amrany, an attempt to establish in the United States the type of facility they had encountered in Italy. Conceived as both an educational center and a workplace, the studio also took on commissions. One of the defining projects of their career was the commission for the bronze statue of basketball player Michael Jordan at Chicago's United Center. For this work, they received an Award of Excellence from the Chicago Bar Association.

Only days away from completing the clay of the Jordon sculpture, Rotblatt-Amrany was diagnosed with breast cancer. Her healing process inspired her to create Healing Energy for the Kellogg Cancer Care Center at NorthShore University HealthSystem in Evanston, Illinois, and Dancing Electrons for the Simmons Cancer Institute at Southern Illinois University in Springfield, Illinois. Her serious illness deepened Rotblatt-Amrany's interest in consciousness and how it integrates with matter, on how matter and energy transform, and on the evolution of human intelligence.

2000 and beyond 
Following on from her recovery from chemotherapy, Rotblatt-Amrany took part in the Beaux Arts Invitational Exhibition in Paris and the Shanghai Art Fair 2000. In 2001 she was invited to mount a one-woman exhibition at the historic Château d'Amboise in Amboise, France. Rotblatt-Amrany's "Theatre of the Soul" exhibition featured 30 sculptures and paintings and attracted media and public attention.

In 2002, Rotblatt-Amrany completed her largest project of the decade; Veterans Memorial Park (2002), a nine-acre site in Munster, Indiana.  The project comprised six vignettes that included bronze sculptures, bas reliefs, laser-engraved images, and found object art.

Other notable works of the 2000s were: 
Quest for Exploration: James A. Lovell (2005), an installation about astronaut James A. Lovell at Chicago's Adler Planetarium 
Preservation of the Union (2006), a bas-relief for the Lincoln Presidential Library in Springfield, Illinois
Chicago White Sox 2005 Championship Piece (2007), an bas-relief of bronze and granite outside U. S. Cellular Field in Chicao 
Chick Hearn (2010), a bronze figure of sportscaster Chick Hearn at Staples Center in Los Angeles
Jackie Chan Tribute (2010), a bronze of actor Jackie Chan for the JC Group in Shanghai.

Rotblatt-Amrany helped create The Julia Foundation, a non-profit organization dedicated to establishing a sculpture garden in historic Fort Sheridan in Lake County, Illinois.

As the second decade of the new century began, Rotblatt-Amrany continued to focus on figurative art, creating Jerry West (2011) for Staples Center in Los Angeles, and Scottie Pippen (2011) for Chicago's United Center. Regarding her figurative public art, she explained, "I believe we are giving something hopeful and energizing back, as we explore the lives of heroic figures and hold up parts of their human and soulful experience that can inspire others."

Style and methods 
Rebelling against the academic bias against figurative art in the 1970s and 1980s, Rotblatt-Amrany has brought new vitality to the subject of the human form by integrating into her work recent discoveries in astronomy, physics, and medicine. Her pieces often juxtapose polar opposites such as serenity and tension and are underpinned philosophically by a view of the universe as a process of endless transformation, with no true beginnings or ends. She has produced a wide array of public art, honoring figures from veterans to sports and film icons to astronauts, while simultaneously creating more experimental paintings and sculptures that explore her personal vision.

Rotblatt-Amrany considers her difficult-to-define style as "evolutionary symbolism." Its roots are conventional—realism, surrealism, and often fantasy—but these provide merely a point of departure. Her approach is to start with a broad concept but then give free rein to creativity—to let the work become itself. In her Petroushka sculptures, for example, she began with the subject matter of the folkloric tale of the puppet who becomes a man. However, the pieces evolved as metaphors of her own inner vision—humans as independent, but mortal, with only limited control over their fate, endlessly evolving and transforming. She is fascinated by the mind-body connection—that is, consciousness and how it affects and integrates with matter. Throughout her works, there is a tendency to incorporate polar opposites—both serenity and tension, both contortion and repose.

Predisposed to stretch as an artist, she has plans for installations that integrate sculpture, projection, and light to simulate transformations in the cosmos—the warping of space and time, the collapse of matter into black holes, its reemergence in unseen dimensions, and how our awareness of these transformations will impact us as a species.

References

External links
 The Artist's Main Website – The Fine Art Studio of Rotblatt-Amrany

1958 births
Living people
People from Highland Park, Illinois
20th-century American painters
21st-century American painters
American women sculptors
American women painters
20th-century American sculptors
20th-century American women artists
21st-century American women artists
People from Fort Sheridan, Illinois